This was the first edition of the event.

Alejandro González won the title, defeating Eduardo Schwank in the final, 6–2, 6–3.

Seeds

Draw

Finals

Top half

Bottom half

References
 Main Draw
 Qualifying Draw

2013 ATP Challenger Tour
Tennis tournaments in Brazil